

344001–344100 

|-bgcolor=#f2f2f2
| colspan=4 align=center | 
|}

344101–344200 

|-bgcolor=#f2f2f2
| colspan=4 align=center | 
|}

344201–344300 

|-bgcolor=#f2f2f2
| colspan=4 align=center | 
|}

344301–344400 

|-bgcolor=#f2f2f2
| colspan=4 align=center | 
|}

344401–344500 

|-id=413
| 344413 Campodeifiori || 2002 BC || Campo dei Fiori di Varese is the name of a beautiful and panoramic 1226-m mountain, just north of the city of Varese. The Schiaparelli Observatory, where this object was discovered, was built on the top in 1964 by Salvatore Furia. Since 1984, Campo dei Fiori has been a regional park, where biodiversity is preserved. || 
|}

344501–344600 

|-id=581
| 344581 Albisetti ||  || Walter Albisetti (1957–2013), a Professor at the Faculty of Medicine of the University of Milan. || 
|}

344601–344700 

|-id=641
| 344641 Szeleczky ||  || Zita Szeleczky (1915–1999), a Hungarian stage and film actress. || 
|}

344701–344800 

|-bgcolor=#f2f2f2
| colspan=4 align=center | 
|}

344801–344900 

|-bgcolor=#f2f2f2
| colspan=4 align=center | 
|}

344901–345000 

|-bgcolor=#f2f2f2
| colspan=4 align=center | 
|}

References 

344001-345000